Viking Direct, trading as Viking, is an office supply mail order catalogue company based in the United Kingdom and a subsidiary of Office Depot Europe. It is headquartered in Leicester, United Kingdom. Founded in 1960 in Los Angeles, California, Viking operates in over eleven countries worldwide, and employs 1,300 people in the United Kingdom. The company is a mail order seller of office supplies to small and medium sized business.

History 
Viking began in 1960, as a small office supply retailer located in Los Angeles, California. The store was opened on January 7, 1960, by Rolf Ostern. Ostern supplemented the retail operation with a catalogue, and this would become the primary marketing technique of the company. In 1969 Ostern changed the name of his store to Viking Office Supplies and moved to a new location. 
 
By the middle of the 1970s, Viking had established itself as a West Coast mail order retailer of discount office supplies to small and medium sized businesses. At that time, the company began a geographic expansion.

Irwin Helford became chairman in 1984, and his photo appeared on the cover of Viking catalogues for many years.

On September 1, 1988, Viking was sold by its founders in a leveraged buyout to the VOP Acquisition Corporation. This company had been founded by Viking's management and the New York investment banking house of Dillon Read & Company, along with some of their affiliates, for the express purpose of purchasing Viking. 
 
In December 1989, VOP was merged into its subsidiary, Viking Office Products, in preparation for the company's initial public offering of stock. On March 14, 1990, Viking offered stock to the public on the NASDAQ stock exchange, selling 2,300,000 shares at a price of $10.50 per share to raise $25 million. 
 
The company made its first move overseas in September, 1990. At that time, Viking established a United Kingdom subsidiary, Viking Direct Limited, and opened a facility in Leicester, England. In making this move, Viking hoped to gain a toe hold in the European Economic Community before the planned unification of that market. In a brief time, Viking Direct became the largest mail order marketer of office supplies in the United Kingdom.
 
The source of Viking's steady growth was its state of the art database and catalogue customising technology.
 
In May 1998, Viking Office Products merged with Office Depot. The following year the company began to move online, launching e-commerce site www.viking-direct.co.uk. In May 2016, following a failed merger with Staples, Office Depot Inc. agreed to sell its European business, including Viking, to Aurelius Group for an undisclosed purchase price. In 2021, Aurelius sold the business to The RAJA Group.

Products
Viking Direct sells print supplies, office supplies, paper and mailing, technology, furniture, and writing instruments.

References

External links
Official Viking Direct website

Retail companies established in 1960
Companies based in Leicester
Office supply companies of the United Kingdom
1960 establishments in California